Prestfelde School is an independent co-educational day and boarding preparatory school, located on London Road in Shrewsbury in Shropshire, England, for children between the ages of 3 and 13. , there are 333 pupils on roll.

Since 1949, the school has formed part of the Woodard Schools group, founded by the Christian educationalist the Reverend Nathaniel Woodard and as such is affiliated to the largest group of Church of England schools in the country. Originally a school for boys, it diversified during the late 1990s and now has nearly 100 girls.

Latest inspections
The latest school inspection by the Independent Schools Council was undertaken in 2015 and the school was rated as Excellent in all areas, and the latest boarding inspection by OFSTED was undertaken in November 2009.

Notable Old Prestfeldians
 Flt Lt Eric Lock DSO DFC & Bar, a Battle of Britain RAF pilot and leading British ace of the Battle, born in Bayston Hill in 1919, attended Prestfelde between 1929 and 1933. 
 Dave Manby - national champion slalom canoeist

References

See also
 School website

Woodard Schools
Boarding schools in Shropshire
Schools in Shrewsbury
Preparatory schools in Shropshire
Church of England private schools in the Diocese of Lichfield